She Works Hard for the Money is the eleventh studio album by Donna Summer, released on June 13, 1983 by Mercury Records. It was her most successful album of the decade, peaking at No. 9 on the Billboard 200 and its title track became one of the biggest hits of her career and her biggest hit of the decade, peaking at No. 3 on the Billboard Hot 100.

Background and production
After emerging on Casablanca Records as the foremost female star of the disco era of the 1970s, Summer in 1980 had sued for release from Casablanca to sign with David Geffen as the inaugural artist for his Geffen label where her recordings were a comparatively modest success: also Summer and David Geffen developed a contentious relationship evidenced by Summer's 1981 album I'm a Rainbow being shelved and the singer being forced by Geffen to leave her longtime producer Giorgio Moroder to record the 1982 album Donna Summer with Quincy Jones. Although Summer considered then reteaming with Moroder (Donna Summer quote:)"I met him in New York and he played me some songs. I didn't think they were right for me."..."I was depressed [not knowing] who was producing my next album. So I prayed about it [and] Michael [Omartian] popped into my head. I had met him only once briefly at the Grammys and he said he was born again. I called his wife [Stormie Omartian], and she told me she had the same idea about him producing me....That was God at work....I could have worked with someone who wasn't born again, but I wouldn't have had that same great feeling." Michael Omartian would attribute Summer's interest in working with him to her having been impressed by the 1980 Omartian-produced #1 Christopher Cross hit "Sailing".

Since departing Casablanca Records in 1980, Summer had been involved in litigation with the label's parent company PolyGram which had cost Summer some $81.6 million in lawyer's fees by 1983, which year (Donna Summer quote:)"I told my lawyers they were fired. I went in and saw the guy at PolyGram personally", negotiating an out-of-court settlement which included Summer's Omartian-produced tracks being given to PolyGram, David Geffen having decided for the second time not to issue an album recorded by Summer. PolyGram affiliate Mercury Records issued Summer's Omartian-produced tracks as the album She Works Hard For the Money in July 1983, the title cut issued as advance single on 10 May 1983 to become Summer's biggest hit since 1979, peaking at #3 peak on the Hot 100 in Billboard where it also spent three weeks at #1 on the R&B chart with this success impelling its parent album, released June 13, 1983, to #9.

She Works Hard for the Money was more pop/dance oriented than the two precedent Donna Summer albums, but also contained some soulful ballads, including "Love Has a Mind of Its Own", a duet with gospel singer Matthew Ward. It also contained a reggae-styled song called "Unconditional Love" which featured vocals by young black British group Musical Youth. Lyrically, the album dealt with subjects such as social injustice ("Stop, Look and Listen"), Jesus Christ ("He's a Rebel") and missing children ("People, People"). Many fans saw the album as a "return to form" for Summer – she was once again presented as a strong, powerful woman very much in control. During the 1970s, Summer's management had worked hard to portray her as a powerful, sexual fantasy figure to the point where they had become too involved in her personal life (which led to a period of depression for Summer before becoming a born-again Christian and filing a lawsuit against her record label). Since the disco era, Summer had experimented with different genres including new wave and rock, and some felt she had got a little "lost" in trying to find her musical place in the new decade. She Works Hard for the Money was universally acclaimed by music reviews and the album had helped establish her place as a 1980s pop/dance diva.

Release

Summer was credited with writing or co-writing every track on the album, mostly alongside Michael Omartian, who was also the album's producer. It became her first Top 10 album in the U.S. since 1979 and produced a massively successful hit single in the form of the title track, which was the final song written for the album. The sleeve of the single and album pictured Summer as a waitress who "works hard for the money" and the song was a tribute to "the working woman". The reverse side of the album also features Onetta Johnson, a bathroom attendant who worked at the iconic Los Angeles restaurant Chasen's whom Summer had encountered in the ladies' room and was the inspiration for the song itself. It was accompanied by a high-profile music video which became heavily promoted on MTV, soon after the breakthrough of Michael Jackson's success on the channel, leading the way for other black artists to be played. The song shot to Number 3 on the Hot 100 American singles chart, making it her biggest hit there since "The Wanderer" three years previously. The song was also given a Grammy nomination for Best Female Pop Vocal Performance.

Singles
Several more singles were released from the album. The aforementioned "Unconditional Love" gave Summer her fourteenth UK Top 20 hit and peaked at #9 on the U.S. R&B chart. "Stop, Look and Listen" peaked at #57 on the UK Music Chart. The soulful duet "Love Has a Mind of Its Own" with Matthew Ward peaked at #70 on the Billboard Hot 100 chart and #35 on the Billboard R&B Hits chart.

The song "He's a Rebel" gained Summer the Grammy award for Best Inspirational Performance, her first win since 1980. The album's closing ballad "I Do Believe (I Fell in Love)" was featured in the Netflix original series Stranger Things 2 in 2017.

Track listing

Personnel 

Vocals
 Donna Summer – vocals
 Musical Youth – vocals (5)
 Matthew Ward – vocals (6, 7), backing vocals 
 Dara Lynn Bernard, Mary Ellen Bernard, Roberta Kelly and Pamela Quinlan – backing vocals

Musicians
 Michael Omartian – pianos, synthesizers, guitars (2), Simmons drums (2, 5), drum programming (2), accordion (9)
 Michael Boddicker – synthesizer programming
 Marty Walsh – guitars (1, 7, 8), guitar solo (4)
 Ray Parker Jr. – rhythm guitars (4)
 Jay Graydon  – guitars (6, 9)
 Nathan East – bass guitar
 Mike Baird – drums
 John Gilston – Simmons drum programming
 Lenny Castro – congas
 Gary Herbig – saxophone (1, 7)
 Dick Hyde – horns 
 Charlie Loper – horns 
 Chuck Findley – horns
 Gary Grant – horns
 Jerry Hey – horns 
 Assa Drori – concertmaster

Production
 Michael Omartian – producer, arrangements 
 John Guess – recording, mixing 
 Larry Ferguson – additional recording
 Ross Pallone – additional recording
 Bernie Grundman – mastering at A&M Mastering (Hollywood, California).
 Steve Hall – mastering at Future Disc (Hollywood, California).
 Chris Whorf – art direction, design 
 Harry Langdon – photography 
 Rick Hunt – CD design

Charts and certifications

Weekly charts

Singles

Certifications

References

1983 albums
Donna Summer albums
Albums produced by Michael Omartian
Mercury Records albums
Dance-rock albums
New wave albums by American artists
Post-disco albums